The 2003 Monaco F3000 round was a motor racing event held on 31 May 2003 at the Circuit de Monaco, Monaco. It was the fourth round of the 2003 International Formula 3000 Championship, and was held in support of the 2003 Monaco Grand Prix.

Classification

Qualifying

Race

See also 
 2003 Monaco Grand Prix

References

International Formula 3000